Hugh Swanson Sidey (September 3, 1927 – November 21, 2005) was an American journalist who worked for Life magazine starting in 1955, then moved on to Time magazine in 1957.

He covered presidents, from Eisenhower to Clinton, and was author of the book Hugh Sidey's Portraits of the Presidents.

Biography
Born in Greenfield, Iowa, in 1927, he attended Iowa State College and graduated with a B.S. in journalism. After graduation he worked for local newspapers in Council Bluffs and Omaha. While in Omaha, he taught undergraduate journalism classes at Creighton University where he was exposed to frequent, lengthy political  debates between conservatives and liberals alike. He learned the lasting lesson that it was paramount to have all your facts straight and that how you said something was sometimes more important than what you said. An old Jesuit at Creighton recommended him to some former students in New York and Sidey landed a job with Life magazine where he made an immediate impact.

Sidey correctly guessed that something was amiss when in 1966 he saw the fastidiously dressed President Lyndon B. Johnson wearing brown shoes with a gray suit. Johnson then flew to Vietnam for a surprise public relations visit later that day. 

He hosted the PBS series The American Presidents. Sidey served as president of the board of directors of the White House Historical Association from 1998 to 2001, during the White House's bicentenary celebration.

Sidey died of an apparent heart attack while vacationing in Paris at the age of 78. Former president George H. W. Bush delivered a eulogy at Sidey's funeral. Sidey left behind three daughters, a son and his wife, Anne.

In 2006, The Hugh S. Sidey Scholarship in Print Journalism was established at the Greenlee School of Journalism and Communications at Iowa State University by The White House Historical Association.

References

 
 Time Warner author page

External links

1927 births
2005 deaths
Iowa State University alumni
Creighton University faculty
American male journalists
20th-century American journalists
Writers from Iowa
Newspaper people from Omaha, Nebraska
People from Greenfield, Iowa